David Lawless is an Irish filmmaker and Creative Director.

David attended the Dún Laoghaire Institute of Art, Design and Technology where he received a BSc in Communications, Film & Video Production.  His graduate short film If Silence Should End starring James Watson received the Kodak Script award and went on to screen on RTÉ, BBC and at several international festivals.

After working as an editor & director in London from 2001 to 2003 and directing the feature documentary Kingdom of the Asante, David returned to Dublin where he began working as a freelance director on many television, documentary, commercial and music video productions. Also in 2003 he founded Brazen Films, an independent film production company.

In 2006, Lawless produced the short film The White Dress.

Since then, Lawless has worked on commercials, web and viral content. In 2014 he produced and directed a Guinness World Record project for EMC and the Lotus Formula One Team.

David currently lives in Portland, Oregon.

Filmography
If Silence Should End 2001 - Short Film - Director
"Kingdom of the Asante" 2002 - Feature Documentary - Director
"Prodrift" 2006 - Lifestyle Series - Director
"Consuming Passions" 2008 - Documentary Series - Director
"Stumptown" 2010 - Short Film - Director

References

External links 
Vimeo portfolio
David Lawless on behance.net

Living people
Irish film directors
Irish film producers
Film people from Dublin (city)
1979 births
Alumni of IADT